O sodales is a Roman Catholic hymn to the Blessed Virgin Mary. It is also the signature song of the American College of the Immaculate Conception, the American seminary located in Leuven, Belgium, which has maintained the hymn over the past century and a half.

Origins 

The tune of the hymn is reputed to have been composed by seminarians fleeing before the armies of Napoleon in the early 19th century.

The Latin text of the hymn as it has been passed down over the years was composed by one of the earliest seminarians of the college, Gustave Limpens, in 1862. It reflects the fraternity felt at the college at the time, as well as the seminarian's missionary zeal to go to North America. The song composed by Limpens was passed down over the years at the American College, until it gradually became accepted as its signature hymn. The college closed because of the Second World War, but was reopened in 1952 by its sixth rector, Thomas Francis Maloney, who reintroduced the hymn to the college, where it has been sung regularly ever since.

Contemporary usage 

The hymn remains well-known among the college's students and alumni today. It is regularly sung at special events at the American College during the academic year, especially at the opening banquet in the autumn, the college's patronal feast of the Immaculate Conception on December 8, and the closing banquet in June. At the closing banquet, it is the tradition of the college that, during the singing of O Sodales, the graduating students stand on chairs facing west toward North America.

Lyrics

References

External links
O Sodales - sung at the American College, Louvain

Christian prayer
Roman Catholic prayers
Marian devotions
Latin-language Christian hymns